Freeway is the third EP by English dubstep artist Flux Pavilion. It was released on 11 November 2013. He also completed a tour under the same name, with Datsik and Roksonix, to promote the release.

Track listing

References 

2013 EPs
Flux Pavilion albums